Beji Caid Essebsi (or es-Sebsi; , ; 29 November 1926 – 25 July 2019) was a Tunisian politician who served as the 6th president of Tunisia from 31 December 2014 until his death on 25 July 2019. Previously, he served as the minister of foreign affairs from 1981 to 1986 and as the prime minister from February 2011 to December 2011.

Essebsi's political career spanned six decades, culminating in his leadership of Tunisia in its transition to democracy. Essebsi was the founder of the Nidaa Tounes political party, which won a plurality in the 2014 parliamentary election. In December 2014, he won the first regular presidential election following the Tunisian Revolution, becoming Tunisia's first democratically elected president.

Early life

Born in 1926, in Sidi Bou Said to an elite family originally from Sardinia (Italy), he was the great-grandson of Ismail Caïd Essebsi, a Sardinian kidnapped by Barbary corsairs in Ottoman Tunisia along the coasts of the island at the beginning of the nineteenth century, who then became a mamluk leader raised with the ruling family after converting to Islam and was later recognized as a free man when he became an important member of the government.

Political career

Essebsi's first involvement in politics came in 1941, when he joined the Neo Destour youth organization in Hammam-Lif. He went to France in 1950 to study law in Paris. He began his career as a lawyer defending Neo-Destour activists.  Essebsi later joined Tunisia's leader Habib Bourguiba, as supporter of the separatist movement and later as his adviser following the country's independence from France in 1956.

Essebsi, a protégé of Bourguiba, held various posts under Bourguiba from 1957 to 1971, including chief of the regional administration, general director of the Sûreté nationale, Interior Minister in 1965, Minister-Delegate to the Prime Minister, Defense Minister in 1969, and then Ambassador to Paris.

From October 1971 to January 1972, he advocated greater democracy in Tunisia and resigned his function, then returned to Tunis.

In April 1981, he came back to the government under Mohamed Mzali as Minister of Foreign Affairs, serving until September 1986. In 1987, he switched allegiance following Ben Ali's removal of Bourguiba from power. He was appointed as Ambassador to West Germany. From 1990 to 1991, he was the Speaker of the Chamber of Deputies.

Interim Prime Minister in 2011

On 27 February 2011, in the aftermath of the Tunisian Revolution, Tunisian Prime Minister Mohamed Ghannouchi resigned following a day of clashes in Tunis with five protesters being killed. On the same day, acting President Fouad Mebazaa appointed Caïd Essebsi as the new Prime Minister, describing him as "a person with an impeccable political and private life, known for his profound patriotism, his loyalty and his self-sacrifice in serving his country." The mostly young protesters however continued taking their discontent to the streets, criticizing the unilateral appointment of Caïd Essebsi without further consultation.

On 5 May accusations of the former Interior Minister Farhat Rajhi that a coup d'etat was being prepared against the possibility of the Islamist Ennahda Party winning the Constituent Assembly election in October. This, again, led to several days of fierce anti-Government protests and clashes on the streets. In the interview disseminated on Facebook, Rajhi called Caïd Essebsi a "liar", whose government had been manipulated by the old Ben Ali circles. Caïd Essebsi strongly rejected Rajhi's accusations as "dangerous and irresponsible lies, [aimed at spreading] chaos in the country" and also dismissed him from his post as director of the High Commission for Human Rights and Fundamental Freedoms, which he had retained after being dismissed from the office as Interior Minister already on 8 March. Nevertheless, Ennahda's president Rached Ghannouchi further fueled the suspicions, stating that "Tunisians doubt the credibility of the Transitional Government."

After the elections in October, Caïd Essebsi left office on 24 December 2011 when the new Interim President Moncef Marzouki appointed Hamadi Jebali of the Islamist Ennahda, which had become the largest parliamentary group.

2014 elections

Following his departure from office, Caïd Essebsi founded the secular Nidaa Tounes party, which won a plurality of the seats in the October 2014 parliamentary election. He was also the party's candidate in the country's first free presidential elections, in November 2014.

On 22 December 2014, official election results showed that Essebsi had defeated incumbent President Moncef Marzouki in the second round of voting, receiving 55.68% of the vote. After the polls closed the previous day, Essebsi said on local television that he dedicated his victory to "the martyrs of Tunisia".

President of Tunisia

Essebsi was sworn in as President on 31 December 2014 at the age of 88, he was the first freely elected president of modern Tunisia. He played a vital role in helping ensure that, more than any other Arab state, the North African country preserved many of the essential gains of the Arab spring movement. He vowed on that occasion to "be president of all Tunisian men and women without exclusion" and stressed the importance of "consensus among all parties and social movements".

On 3 August 2016, Essebsi appointed Youssef Chahed as a prime minister as the parliament withdrew confidence from Habib Essid's government.

In 2017 he called for legal amendments to the inheritance law to ensure equal rights for men and women, and he called for Tunisian women to be able to marry non-Muslims, which he believed is not in direct conflict with Sharia or the Tunisian constitution.

In 2018 he proposed a revision of Tunisian electoral law, which he felt contained many shortcomings going against the principles of the revolution.

On 13 August 2018, he promised also to submit a bill to parliament soon which would aim to give women equal inheritance rights with men, as debate over the topic of inheritance reverberated throughout the Muslim world.

Concerning the economic crisis of Tunisia, he declared that the year 2018 would be difficult but that the hope of economic revival was still possible.

In April 2019, Essebsi announced he would not seek a second term in that year's presidential election, saying it was time to "open the door to the youth."

Beji Caid Essebsi was recognized for his role in  reinforcing democratic advances in the face of economic hardship and terrorism.

Illness and death

On 27 June 2019, Essebsi was hospitalized at a military hospital in Tunis due to a serious illness. The following day his condition stabilized.

He was re-admitted to hospital on 24 July 2019, and died the following day, 25 July 2019 (which coincided with the 62nd anniversary of the abolition of the Tunisian monarchy), five months before his term was due to end. In addition to Tunisia, which declared mourning 7 days, eight other countries announced mourning 3 days after the death of Essebsi, namely Libya, Algeria, Mauritania, Jordan, Palestine, Lebanon, Egypt and Cuba. Likewise, the United Nations stood for a minute of silence, and flew flags for a day, after Essebsi’s death.

The electoral commission subsequently announced that Essebsi's successor would be elected sooner than the original date of 17 November, due to the constitutional provision that in the event of the president's death, a permanent successor must be in office within 90 days. The president of the Assembly of Representatives of the People, Mohamed Ennaceur, served as acting president in the meantime. Ultimately, the election was pushed up to 15 September.

His state funeral took place on 27 July in Carthage in the presence of dignitaries such as :
 Mohamed Ennaceur (President of Tunisia)
 Emmanuel Macron (President of France)
 Felipe VI (King of Spain)
 Marcelo Rebelo de Sousa (President of Portugal)
 George Vella (President of Malta)
 Albert II (Prince of Monaco)
 Joachim Gauck (Former President of Germany)
 Simonetta Sommaruga (Former President of Switzerland)
 Abdelkader Bensalah (President of Algeria)
 Mahmoud Abbas (President of Palestine)
 Fayez al-Sarraj (Chairman of the Presidential Council of Libya)
 Tamim bin Hamad Al Thani (Emir of Qatar)
 Ghassan Salame (Deputy Secretary General of the United Nations)
 Ahmed Aboul Gheit (Secretary General of the Arab League)
 Taïeb Baccouche (Secretary General of the Arab Maghreb Union)
 Moulay Rachid (Prince of Morocco)
 Hamad bin Mohammed Al Sharqi (Emir of Fujairah)
 Fuat Oktay (Vice President of Turkey)
 Stephane Dion (Special Envoy of the Prime Minister of Canada)
 Ulrich Brechbuhl (Counselor of the United States Department of State).

A procession took place from the Carthage Palace to Jellaz Cemetery where he was buried. Abdullah II (King of Jordan) also came to Tunisia on 29 July to offer condolences to the President of Tunisia Mohamed Ennaceur and to the family of President Beji Caid Essebsi.

Personal life
Essebsi married Chadlia Saïda Farhat on 8 February 1958. The couple had four children: two daughters, Amel and Salwa, and two sons, Mohamed Hafedh and Khélil.

His wife died on 15 September 2019, aged 83, nearly two months after her husband.

Honours and awards

Tunisian national medals

Foreign honors

 Medal of Honor of the Republic of Algeria (3 January 2013)
 Collar of the Order of Sheikh Isa bin Salman Al Khalifa (Bahrain; 27 January 2016)
 Grand Cordon of the Supreme Order of the Renaissance (Jordan; 20 October 2015)
 Collar of the Order of King Abdulaziz (Kingdom of Saudi Arabia; 29 March 2019)
 Knight Grand Cross with Collar of Order of Merit of the Italian Republic (8 January 2017)
 Honorary Companions of Honour with Collar of the National Order of Merit (Malta; 5 February 2019)
 Grand Collar of the State of Palestine (6 July 2017)
 Second Class of the Order of the Republic of Serbia (2016)
 Grand Cross of the Order of Civil Merit (Spain; 28 October 1969)
 Knight of the Order of the Seraphim (Sweden; 4 November 2015)
 Collar of the Order of the State of Republic of Turkey (27 December 2017)

Awards

 Honorary Degree from Paris-Sorbonne University (2015)
 Founder's Award of International Crisis Group (2015)
 Freedom of the City of Amman (2015)
 Medal of Arab tourism (2017)
 Tunisian Politician of the Year (2017)
 Leadership Award of Global Hope Coalition (2018)

Publications
 Bourguiba : le bon grain et l'ivraie, éd. Sud Éditions, Tunis, 2009, 
 La Tunisie : la démocratie en terre d'islam (with Arlette Chabot), éd. Plon, Paris, 2016

Gallery

References

External links

|-

|-

|-

|-

|-

1926 births
2019 deaths
Tunisian Muslims
Democratic Constitutional Rally politicians
Neo Destour politicians
Nidaa Tounes politicians
People from Tunis Governorate
People of the Tunisian Revolution
Presidents of the Chamber of Deputies (Tunisia)
Presidents of Tunisia
Prime Ministers of Tunisia
Socialist Destourian Party politicians
Tunisian people of Sardinian descent
Tunisian people of Italian descent
Ambassadors of Tunisia to Germany
Ambassadors of Tunisia to France
Foreign ministers of Tunisia
20th-century Tunisian politicians
21st-century Tunisian politicians
Interior ministers of Tunisia